Geumganghan (금강한, The Grief of Geumgan) is a 1931 Korean film written by Lee Chang-Yong.  It was directed by and starred Na Woon-gyu. It premiered at Dan Sung Sa theater in downtown Seoul.

Plot
The film concerns the playboy son of a rich man. After he gets a village girl pregnant, she commits suicide. The playboy is later murdered by his ex-wife.

References

External links 
 Images from Geumganghan at The Korean Film Archive (KOFA)

See also
 Korea under Japanese rule
 List of Korean-language films
 Cinema of Korea

1931 films
Pre-1948 Korean films
Korean silent films
Korean black-and-white films
Korean-language films
Films directed by Na Woon-gyu